The women's +87 kilograms competition at the 2021 World Weightlifting Championships was held on 16 and 17 December 2021.

Schedule

Medalists

Records

Results

References

Results

Women's 87+ kg
World Championships